CWBL is an acronym which may refer to:

 California Women's Baseball League of California
 Chicago Women's Baseball League  of Chicago, Illinois
 Canadian Wheelchair Basketball League a Wheelchair basketball league
 Centre for Work Based Learning at Cardiff Metropolitan University
 Coloma Way Branch Library in Roseville, California
 Country-Wide Basketball League in the Philippines